Yamba Asha João (born July 31, 1976) is a retired Angolan footballer.

Career
A defender, Asha used to play for AS Aviação in his homeland and is a member of the Angola national football team, collecting 49 caps by the end of 2005.

However, the left-back was excluded from their 2006 FIFA World Cup party, since he was banned by FIFA for nine months for failing a drugs test following a World Cup qualifier against Rwanda in October 2005.

He was recalled for an African Nations Cup qualifier against Swaziland in September 2006.

National team statistics

See also
List of doping cases in sport

External links

References

1976 births
Living people
Angolan footballers
Angola international footballers
2008 Africa Cup of Nations players
Doping cases in association football
Angolan sportspeople in doping cases
Atlético Petróleos de Luanda players
Atlético Sport Aviação players
C.R. Caála players
Domant FC players
Estrela Clube Primeiro de Maio players
Östers IF players
Girabola players
Allsvenskan players
Angolan expatriate footballers
Expatriate footballers in Sweden
Association football defenders